The 1962 Soviet football championship was the 30th seasons of competitive football in the Soviet Union and the 24th among teams of sports societies and factories. Spartak won the championship becoming the Soviet domestic champions for the eighth time.

Honours

Notes = Number in parentheses is the times that club has won that honour. * indicates new record for competition

Soviet Union football championship

Class A (second stage)

Places 1–12

Places 13–22

Class B

Russian Federation finals
 [Krasnodar, Oct 27 – Nov 9]

Ukraine (second stage)
For places 1-6

Union republics finals
 [Oct 31, Nov 4, Odessa] 
 Shakhtyor Karaganda  1-0 0-0 Lokomotiv Gomel

Top goalscorers

Class A
Mikhail Mustygin (Belarus Minsk) – 17 goals

References

External links
 1962 Soviet football championship. RSSSF